Antoine Poidebard (Lyon, 12 October 1878 – Beirut, 17 August 1955) was a French archaeologist and Jesuit missionary. He pioneered aerial archaeology in the Middle East.

References

1878 births
1955 deaths
Archaeologists from Lyon
Clergy from Lyon
French Jesuits
French Roman Catholic missionaries
Jesuit missionaries
Jesuit scientists
Remote sensing archaeologists